Revolver (stylized as rEVOLVEr) is the fourth studio album by Swedish metal band The Haunted. It was released on 18 October 2004.

After having been absent for the previous two studio albums, Peter Dolving was once again back in the band and provided the vocals for rEVOLVEr. He would remain with the band until he left once again in 2012.

As the title on the album indicates with its stylized typography (i.e. with the word "EVOLVE" printed in upper case letters between the two lower case r's), the band made a conscious decision to tweak (or "evolve") its songwriting on this album. As a result, rEVOLVEr contains some elements that were absent on previous The Haunted albums. Although the album still contains examples of the band's familiar thrash metal sound (e.g. "No Compromise", "Sabotage", "Sweet Relief"), it features considerably more mid-paced riffing (e.g. "99", "Burnt to a Shell", "Fire Alive") than in any of their previous albums. Two of the tracks even have ballad elements interspersed in them ("Abysmal" and "My Shadow").
Also notable is that rEVOLVEr has quite a few instances of clean singing in it, although the vast majority of the vocal tracking was still done in The Haunted's traditional hardcore/metalcore style of screaming.

A limited edition digipak of this CD contained two bonus tracks, and different artwork.

A music video was made for "No Compromise" which featured Barney Greenway.

Track listing 

The limited edition of the album contains the bonus tracks "Fire Alive" and "Smut King" at tracks 11 and 12, respectively. "My Shadow" was moved to track 13.

The Japanese release contains the bonus track "Out of Reach" at track 9, respectively. "Nothing Right" was moved to track 10. The bonus track "Smut King" is not on this edition. However, "Fire Alive" still remains at track 11, therefore keeping the album at 13 tracks.

Release history

Personnel 
Peter Dolving – vocals
Anders Björler – lead guitar
Jonas Björler – bass, backing vocals
Patrik Jensen – rhythm guitar
Per Möller Jensen – drums

Guest
Lou Koller (Sick of It All) – co-vocals on "Who Will Decide"

References 

2004 albums
The Haunted (Swedish band) albums
Century Media Records albums
Albums produced by Fredrik Nordström